Phytopythium vexans (previously named Pythium vexans) is a plant pathogen infecting citruses. P. vexans was identified as an intermediate between Phytophthora and Pythium species, being more closely related to Phytophthora.

References

Water mould plant pathogens and diseases
Citrus diseases
vexans